Kobzar (Ukrainian: Кобзар, "The bard"), is a book of poems by Ukrainian poet and painter Taras Shevchenko, first published by him in 1840 in Saint Petersburg, Russia. Taras Shevchenko was nicknamed The Kobzar after the publishing of this book. From that time on this title has been applied to Shevchenko's poetry in general and acquired a symbolic meaning of the Ukrainian national and literary revival.

The first publication consisted of eight poems: "Думи мої, думи мої, лихо мені з вами" (My thoughts, my thoughts, you are my doom), "Перебендя" (Perebendya), "Катерина" (Kateryna), "Тополя" (Poplar tree), "Думка" (Thought), "Нащо мені чорні брови" (Why should I have Black Eyebrows), "До Основ'яненка" (To Osnovyanenko), "Іван Підкова" (Ivan Pidkova), and "Тарасова ніч" (Taras's night).

There were three editions of the Kobzar during Shevchenko's lifetime: 1840, 1844 and 1860. Two last of them included Hajdamaki — another famous book (poem) by Taras Shevchenko, published in 1841. 1844 edition was entitled as Чигиринський Кобзар і Гайдамаки ("Chyhyryn's Kobzar and Hajdamaki" or "Kobzar of Chyhyryn and Hajdamaki").

Censorship in the Russian Empire prompted publication of the poetry by Taras Shevchenko in non-Russia-ruled lands, such as Prague (now in the Czech Republic) or German editions.

Word definition

Literally, kobzar in Ukrainian means a bard, although not a regular one, but rather the one who along with singing plays on a musical instrument, kobza. Kobza is roughly similar to a lute.

In the contemporary Ukrainian the word is also associated with the famous Ukrainian poet Taras Shevchenko who was given the same nickname.

A complete collection of Ukrainian poems by Taras Shevchenko is called Kobzar too, after the title of Shevchenko's first book.

Important editions of the XIX — early XX centuries.
Publications in Osnova magazine
Read more: Kobzar 1861
In January–December 1861, an unordered selection of 69 poems by Taras Shevchenko was published in the magazine Osnova (Books I-XII) edited by Vasyl Bilozersky. Each of the publications was entitled "Kobzar". The text is printed in Kulishivka and has accents on words with several syllables (except for the letter "i", on which the printing house could not always mark accents for technical reasons). Book I appeared during Shevchenko's lifetime, and an obituary was published in February II.

In 1867, the Kobzar was published at the expense of the Russian publisher D. Kozhanchikov. It was at that time the most complete edition of "Kobzar", compiled by MI Kostomarov and GS Vashkevich. On June 6, 1867, IT Lysenkov filed a lawsuit with the St. Petersburg District Court, accusing D. Yu. Kozhanchikov of illegally publishing Shevchenko's works. MO Nekrasov, MI Kostomarov and OM Pippin acted as experts in court. The process, which lasted ten years, ended in favor of D. Kozhanchikov (see: Bezyazychny V. Taras Shevchenko and bookseller Ivan Lysenkov... // Book trade. — 1964. — No. 3). [5]

"Kobzar", published in 1911 in St. Petersburg
More extensive (containing many previously unpublished works of the poet) was the Prague edition of "Kobzar" in 1876, commissioned by the Kiev "Community" Alexander Rusov. He brought Taras Hryhorovych's brothers Osyp and Mykyta to Kyiv from Kyrylivka. Citizens bought from them the right to publish all works. On October 24, 1874, a "merchant" was concluded in Kyiv. Under its terms, for four years Shevchenko had to receive 5 thousand rubles — a huge amount at the time. In 1875, Alexander Rusov left for Prague, where he published Kobzar (1875-1876) in two volumes. Russian imperial censorship allowed to import only the first volume into Russia. In the second volume, 18 poems (from the Big Book) appeared for the first time.

1878 — in Geneva, Mikhail Drahomanov published a pocket version of the Kobzar in reprint. The size of the book is 9 by 5 cm. The books were smuggled into Ukraine in cigarette packs.

1880 — Mikhail Drahomanov published a version of the Kobzar in Ukrainian Latin.

1889 — The Kobzar was first published in Kyiv.

In 1907, 1908 and 1910 a relatively complete edition of "Kobzar" was published, prepared by the Ukrainian scientist Vasyl Domanytsky.

A 19-volume Kobzar was published by the same scholar in 1911 at the Valentin Yakovenko publishing house in St. Petersburg, dedicated to the 50th anniversary of Taras Shevchenko's death. The title page of the publication with a portrait of Shevchenko was made by Ivan Kramskaya, and the drawings were prepared by Samiylo Dudin and Mykhailo Tkachenko.

1914 — in Lviv The Taras Shevchenko Scientific Society reprinted a small number of phototypes of the first edition from 1840 (114 pages), which are also rare today. They differ from the first printing by lower quality of paper. On a separate page the initial data of this edition — the publisher, year of the reprint edition, circulation were specified. Books with this page are very rare.

1928--in Kyiv-Kharkiv, was published an illustrated edition by the publishing house Radianske selo (Soviet village).  The cover wrappers are by Okhrim Sudomora.

Edition

Lifetime publications

The first edition 
The first edition of "Kobzar" was printed in the private printing house of EF Fischer in St. Petersburg (Russia) with a circulation of 1,000 copies. Of these, the first 100 copies had 115 pages of text, but most of them, after the intervention of the censor, were removed and destroyed before the sale, and about ten, which Taras Shevchenko gave to friends — remained. Currently, the only known copy, which has 115 pages of text that belonged to Taras Shevchenko and was confiscated from him during his first arrest, is kept in St. Petersburg (Russia), and the remaining books have 114 pages.

The first edition of "Kobzar" included eight early works:

 "My thoughts, my thoughts, woe is me with you!"
 "Perebendya",
 "Katerina",
 "Poplar",
 "Thought" (Why do I have black eyebrows...),
 "To Osnovyanenko",
 "Ivan Pidkova",
 "Tarasova night".

Six of them were dedicated.

Of all the lifetime editions of the works, the first "Kobzar" had the most attractive appearance: high-quality paper, convenient format, clear font. A notable feature of this "Kobzar" is the etching at the beginning of the book by Vasyl Sternberg: the folk singer is a kobzar with a boy-guide. This is not an illustration of a separate work, but a generalized image of a kobzar, which gave the name to the collection. The release of this "Kobzar", even cut by tsarist censorship, is an event of great literary and national significance.

After the arrest of Taras Shevchenko in 1847, the Kobzar was banned in the Russian Empire and confiscated from libraries and bookstores, as well as from individual citizens, which made this publication rare during the poet's lifetime. Only a few copies of Taras Shevchenko's Kobzar of 1840 have survived in the world. One of them (114 pages) is stored in the National Library of Ukraine named after Vernadsky, another — in the Cherkasy Museum "Kobzar", is also in the Museum of the Liberation Struggle. S. Bandera (London — Great Britain) and in the library of Harvard University (USA). Kobzar was copied and even sold in manuscripts. A copy of the Kobzar, transcribed and painted by T. Shevchenko's friends, which they presented to him instead of the one taken away by the guards after his return from exile, has been preserved.

Second edition 
In 1844, under the title "Chyhyryn Kobzar", a reprint of the first edition of "Kobzar" was published with the addition of the poem "Haydamaky".

Third edition 
"Kobzar" was published in 1860 at the expense of Platon Symyrenko, with whom Taras Shevchenko met during his last trip to Ukraine in 1859 in Mliiv. Platon Simirenko - a well-known sugar producer and philanthropist in Ukraine - allocated 1,100 rubles for the publication of "Kobzar". This edition was much more complete than the previous ones: it included 17 works. At the beginning - a portrait of Taras Shevchenko. However, the poems "Dream", "Caucasus", "Heretic", the poem "Testament" and similar works could not be included in the publication due to censorship.

Other lifetime publications 
A number of poems that were not included in the Kobzar due to censorship were published by the poet's friends in Leipzig in 1859: a collection of New Poems by Pushkin and Shevchenko.

In the same year, 1860, Kobzar was translated by Russian poets (St. Petersburg, 1860; translated into Russian by M. Gerbel). This is the last edition of "Kobzar" during the author's lifetime.

Publication of the Ukrainian diaspora 
1922 - an illustrated collection of T. Shevchenko's poems entitled "Kobzar" with a biography and foreword by Bohdan Lepky was published by the Ukrainske Slovo publishing house in Berlin.

1940 - A unique alphabet of the Kobzar is published by the Ukrainian publishing house in Kraków.

See also

 Izbornyk
 List of Ukrainian-language poets
 List of Ukrainian-language writers
 Ukrainian literature

References

External links
 The Kobzar of the Ukraine: being select poems of Taras Shevchenko by A. J. Hunter at Internet Archive
 

Ukrainian poems
Taras Shevchenko
Ukrainian books
Poetry collections
1840 books
Ukrainian-language books